The 2003 British motorcycle Grand Prix was the eighth round of the 2003 MotoGP Championship. It took place on the weekend of 11–13 July 2003 at the Donington Park circuit.

MotoGP classification

250 cc classification

125 cc classification

Championship standings after the race (motoGP)

Below are the standings for the top five riders and constructors after round eight has concluded.

Riders' Championship standings

Constructors' Championship standings

 Note: Only the top five positions are included for both sets of standings.

Notes

References

British motorcycle Grand Prix
British
Motorcycle Grand Prix
July 2003 sports events in the United Kingdom